Events from the year 1549 in France

Incumbents
 Monarch – Henry II

Events

Literature
La Défense et illustration de la langue française by the poet Joachim du Bellay

Births

3 February – Louis of Valois, prince (d. 1550) 
4 February – Eustache Du Caurroy, composer (d. 1609)
20 July – Pierre de Larivey, dramatist (d. 1619)
17 October – Denis Godefroy, jurist (d. 1622). 
5 November – Philippe de Mornay, Protestant writer and member of the anti-monarchist Monarchomaques (d. 1623)

Full date missing
Louis de Bussy d'Amboise, a gentleman at the court, a swordsman, dandy, and a lover of both sexes (d. 1579)
Eustache Du Caurroy, composer (d. 1609)
Jeanne de Laval, noble (d. 1586)
Étienne Tabourot, jurist, writer and poet (d. 1590)
Marie Touchet, Dame de Belleville (d. 1638)
Sébastien Zamet, banker (d. 1614)

Deaths

21 December Marguerite de Navarre, the princess of France, Queen of Navarre, and Duchess of Alençon and Berry (b. 1492)

Full date missing
Idelette Calvin (b. 1500) 
Jean de Gagny, theologian
Michelle de Saubonne, courtier (b. 1485)

See also

References

1540s in France